The grey-sided bush warbler (Cettia brunnifrons) is a species of bush warbler (family Cettiidae). It was formerly included in the "Old World warbler" assemblage.

It is found from northern Pakistan to central China.

References

grey-sided bush warbler
Birds of North India
Birds of Nepal
Birds of Bhutan
Birds of Central China
grey-sided bush warbler